Jack Pyc (born July 17, 1972 in Wrocław, Poland) is a Polish-born, Canadian bobsledder who competed in the 1990s. He won a silver medal in the two-man event at the 1995 FIBT World Championships in Winterberg along with 16 World Cup medals and 3 Overall World Cup Championships.

Pyc also competed in three Winter Olympics, ( 1992 Albertville France, 1994 Lillehammer Norway and 1998 Nagano Japan) earning his best finish of ninth in the four-man at Nagano in 1998.

References
1992 bobsleigh four-man results
1994 bobsleigh four-man results
1998 bobsleigh two-man results
1998 bobsleigh four-man results
Bobsleigh two-man world championship medalists since 1931
Canoe.ca profile

1972 births
Bobsledders at the 1992 Winter Olympics
Bobsledders at the 1994 Winter Olympics
Bobsledders at the 1998 Winter Olympics
Canadian male bobsledders
Living people
Polish male bobsledders
Sportspeople from Wrocław